A new religion is a religious or spiritual group that has modern origins but is peripheral to its society's dominant religious culture.

New religion may also refer to:

New Religion (album), by Primal Fear, 2007
"New Religion" (song), by Duran Duran, 1982
"New Religion" (Anton Ewald song), 2021
"New Religion" (Black Veil Brides song), 2011